The tabla tarang (Hindi: तबला तरंग) is a melodic percussion instrument consisting of between ten and sixteen tuned dayan drums. In a tabla "pair" instrument, the dayan is the treble drum and the bayan is the bass drum. Tarang means "waves". By hitting with the hand at the center of the different dayan drums – known as syahi – notes of different pitches are produced like a bell ringing. The player is able to perform melodies based on several ragas.

Notable tabla tarangists
 Pt. Kamalesh Maitra
 Sandip Burman

See also
 Pat waing
Tabla

References
 Rosenthal, Ethel (2003). The Story of Indian Music and Its Instruments. Low Price Publications. .

External links
Tabla tarang video
Smithsonian Institution Audios

Membranophones
Pitched percussion instruments
Indian musical instruments